The Gran Sasso and Monti della Laga National Park is a natural park in central Italy. The terrain is predominantly mountainous with alpine plains.

It is managed by Ente Parco Nazionale Gran Sasso e Monti della Laga, with headquarters in Assergi, L'Aquila.

The Grand Highway of the Gran Sasso and Monti della Laga National Park runs through the park between the Gran Sasso mountain peak and the chain known as Monti della Laga.

Geography

The park is one of the largest protected areas in Europe, and is centered around the massif of the Gran Sasso, which dominates the surrounding landscape; it rises vertically on the immense pastures of the Campo Imperatore. The land is very rocky and receives a large amount of snow and wind. The Calderone lies just beneath the tallest peak, the Corno Grande, and it is considered to be Europe's southernmost glacier. On the north side there is the profile of Monti della Laga chain, where thousands of migratory birds stop on the shores of Lake Campotosto. This area is completely covered by woods of beeches, firs, turkey oaks and chestnuts.

Nature and wildlife 

The park contains one of the most biologically diverse areas of Europe. The park contains more than two thousand plant species, some of which are found exclusively in this area, such as the Abruzzo Edelweiss. Many species of wildlife inhabit the park, including rare animals such as the Abruzzo chamois, as well as wolves, Marsican brown bear, roe deer, wildcats, wild boars, foxes and squirrels. Notable birds include the golden eagle, the white-backed woodpecker, the goshawk, the common buzzard and the peregrine falcon. There are also a wide variety of insects, such as the apollo butterfly.

Attractions
The park contains a very long circuit of approximately  featuring trails that can be visited on horseback, by mountain bike, or on foot.

Many outdoor activities are possible within the park including hiking, Horse riding, mountain biking, Canoeing, Bird watching, Alpine skiing, ski mountaineering, and Cross-country skiing.

Educational projects are active in the park visitor centres, and trails and paths can be freely explored alone or with the assistance of mountain guides.

Settlements
Many old villages are located within the confines the national park. They tend to be quite small, with stone and brick houses and narrow streets. In many cases, the place names highlight the defensive nature of the settlement and a summit position, such as Castel (castle), Rocca, Pizzo (peak), and Colle (hill).

Province of L'Aquila
Assergi, Barete, Barisciano, Cagnano Amiterno, Calascio, Campotosto, Capestrano, Capitignano, Carapelle Calvisio, Castel del Monte, Castel Paganica, Castelvecchio Calvisio, L'Aquila, Montereale, Ofena, Pizzoli, Santo Stefano di Sessanio, Villa Santa Lucia degli Abruzzi

Province of Ascoli Piceno
Acquasanta Terme, Arquata del Tronto

Province of Pescara
Brittoli, Bussi sul Tirino, Carpineto della Nora, Castiglione a Casauria, Civitella Casanova, Corvara, Farindola, Montebello di Bertona, Pescosansonesco, Villa Celiera

Province of Rieti
Accumoli, Amatrice

Province of Teramo
Arsita, Campli, Castelli, Civitella del Tronto, Cortino, Crognaleto, Fano Adriano, Isola del Gran Sasso d'Italia, Montorio al Vomano, Pietracamela, Rocca Santa Maria, Torricella Sicura, Tossicia, Valle Castellana.

External links

—Official Gran Sasso e Monti della Laga National Park website
—The National Park of the Gran Sasso
—Parks.it: Park Authority in Abruzzo 
UNESCO photographer's gallery of Campo-Imperatore

National parks of Italy
Parks in Abruzzo
Parks in Lazio
Parks in Marche
Province of L'Aquila
Province of Pescara
Province of Teramo
Protected areas of the Apennines
Protected areas established in 2001
2001 establishments in Italy